The  Cao Lãnh Bridge  is a cable-stayed bridge over the Tiền River, a branch of the Mekong River at Cao Lãnh in Vietnam. The bridge is one of three components of the planned Central Mekong Delta Connectivity Project (CMDCP). The other two components are the Vàm Cống Bridge at Vàm Cống and the 4 lane expressway connecting the two bridges. The Cao Lanh Bridge was inaugurated on 27 May 2018.

Design
It carries four lanes for traffic. The maximum speed on the bridge will be 80 km/h.

The objective of the Central Mekong Delta Connectivity Project is to encourage the economic and social development of the Cửu Long Delta area. The project was developed with the financial assistance from the Asian Development Bank (ADB) and the Government of Australia. It is jointly funded by the governments of Australia and Vietnam, and the ADB. The bridge was the largest overseas assistance project undertaken by the Australian government costing A$160 million.

Construction
The groundbreaking ceremony for the Cao Lanh Bridge, was held on 19 October 2013 and attended by senior officials from the Vietnamese and Australian Governments and the Asian Development Bank (ADB). The bridge was expected to be completed after 43 months in mid-2017 but was delayed.

The opening of the bridge, held on 27 May 2018, was attended by Vietnam Deputy Prime Minister Trinh Dinh Dung, Australian Foreign Minister Julie Bishop, Vietnam Minister for Transport Nguyen Van The, ADB Country Director Eric Sidgwick and senior officials from ministries, cities and provinces.

See also 
 List of Bridges in Vietnam

References

External links
  Viet Nam Central Mekong Delta Connectivity Project Inception Report
 Department of Foreign Affairs and Trade, AusAid: The Cao Lanh Bridge
Bridge at the CRBC web-page

Road bridges in Vietnam
Cable-stayed bridges in Vietnam
Bridges completed in 2018
Toll bridges in Vietnam
Buildings and structures in Đồng Tháp province
2018 in Vietnam